The Korg Prophecy is considered one of the earliest (mid-nineties) virtual analog (a.k.a. VA) synthesizers, although its synthesis capabilities went beyond many of its VA contemporaries.

Details
Along with the Korg Z1, the Korg Prophecy is a direct ancestor of the ill-fated OASYS project. It was a small three-octave monosynth, a pioneer of the late 1990s return-to-analog trend. Offering assignable knobs, a "log controller" (a combination of a modulation wheel and ribbon controller assembled like a sausage) and many other control sources, it invited players to tweak and shape the sound both easily and quickly. However, deep editing wasn't as straightforward, because the sound engine contained 13 DSP-modeled oscillator types, each one offering a large number of parameters to adjust. Some of the most used DSP models were the analog model (based on the classic osc+filter+amp scheme, although with many powerful enhancements), the VPM model (a form of FM synthesis which avoided Yamaha's FM patent) and the physical modeling algorithms. The latter deserves special mention. In the mid to late 1990s, it was believed that physical modeling, which recreated the sound of acoustic instruments (brass, strings, woodwinds, etc.) using DSP algorithms instead of samples, would eventually replace sample-based synthesis of those instruments, because of its unprecedented realism and expressiveness . As time passed, physical modeling seemed to lose its appeal to both manufacturers (because of the cost of investigation and implementation) and final users, who complained about the realism of the models and limited polyphony . Also, more complex playing techniques were required to play the models in a convincing way. Nevertheless, the Prophecy's low cost and broad implementation of sound generation techniques earned it a significant place in synthesizer history.

Technically, the Prophecy offered one-note monophony, several effects (including distortion, wave shaping, delay/reverb and chorus/flanger), and 128 memory locations for user sound programs. No sequencer was included, but its integrated arpeggiator was a source of instant gratification, as some magazines put it.  A PCMCIA slot allowed for offline storage of patches and banks. Standard MIDI sockets, a special socket for connecting an EC5 pedal bank, a sustain pedal socket, and a pair of audio outputs occupied the rear panel.

Korg made a major breakthrough at the time, offering a low cost expansion card for Trinity users, which incorporated the whole sound engine of the Prophecy into the already powerful workstation. Gone was the arpeggiator and some minor features, but the editing was much improved through the Trinity's big touchscreen, and the workstation's effects processing was a huge improvement over the Prophecy's basic set.

A direct descendant of the Prophecy is the Korg Z1 (1997) which is the equivalent of a 12-note polyphonic Prophecy with enhanced models, more physical control, 61-note keyboard, bigger screen, 6-part multitimbrality, more presets and two powerful programmable twin arpeggiators.

Options
DS-1 Damper Pedal
EC-5 Multi Footpedal External Controller
EXP-2 Foot Controller
PHC-11 Analogue & Vintage ROM Card
PHC-12 Modern Models ROM Card
PS-1 Pedal Switch
PS-2 Pedal Switch
SRC-512 512k RAM Card
XVP-10 Expression/Volume Pedal

Notable users
Apollo 440
Autechre
Eat Static
Ed Wynne (Ozric Tentacles)
George Michael
James Asher
Jean-Michel Jarre
Joe Zawinul
Jonny Greenwood (Radiohead) from 1996 to 1998
Liam Howlett used the Korg Prophecy, for the main riff on the Prodigy's "Smack My Bitch Up".
The Crystal Method used a Prophecy on "quite a few songs", according to member Scott Kirkland

References

Further reading

External links
  Korg Prophecy patch editor for Windows.
 Korg Prophecy Korg Product Archive
 New analog synth style patches from AnalogAudio1
 Polynominal Korg Prophecy Review | audio clips and manual

Virtual analog synthesizers
P
Monophonic synthesizers
Digital synthesizers